Holst's frog (Babina holsti) is a species of frog in the family Ranidae. It is endemic to the Ryukyu Islands of Japan. It occurs on mountains of the Okinawa and Tokashiki islands. It lives in primary or recovered secondary broad-leaved evergreen forests. It is threatened by habitat loss caused by road and dam construction.

References

Babina (frog)
Endemic amphibians of Japan
Endemic fauna of the Ryukyu Islands
Taxonomy articles created by Polbot
Amphibians described in 1892